The 1958 Wrestling World Cup was held from June 20 to 22 in Sofia, Bulgaria. The second freestyle Wrestling World Cup drew 76 wrestlers from 14 countries. This was the second World Cup organized by FILA. As during the first edition in each weight category, a separate individual tournament was held, and the winning team was determined by the total number of the points gained by each of its participants. As during the previous edition, the winner of the World Cup was the USSR National Team, which scored 38 points. This time, Greco-Roman wrestling event has not been contested. Roger Coulon, President of the International Wrestling Federation, visited Bulgaria for the World Cup, he called the event "an example of sports organization."

Final ranking

Medal summary

Commemoration
Bulgarian painter Vesselin Tomov made designs for a series of commemorative postage stamps "1958 World Cup Wrestling Championship," which were published later that year by the Bulgarian Post Office.

References

Sources

News

Web
World Cup, Freestyle Seniors, 1958-06-20 Sofia (BUL). Institut für Angewandte Trainingswissenschaft Ringen Datenbanken (Wrestling Database).

1958 in sport wrestling

Wrestling World Cup
International wrestling competitions hosted by Bulgaria
Wrestling World Cup
Wrestling World Cup